The Corvallis Hotel, located in Corvallis, Oregon, is listed on the National Register of Historic Places.

See also
 National Register of Historic Places listings in Benton County, Oregon

References

External links

1927 establishments in Oregon
Georgian architecture in Oregon
Hotel buildings completed in 1927
Hotels in Corvallis, Oregon
National Register of Historic Places in Benton County, Oregon
Frederick Manson White buildings
Historic American Buildings Survey in Oregon